Kuyulu is a village in the Adıyaman District, Adıyaman Province, Turkey. The village is populated by Kurds of the Şikakî tribe and had a population of 1,526 in 2021.

The hamlet of Reşathan is attached to Kuyulu.

References 

Villages in Adıyaman District
Kurdish settlements in Adıyaman Province